Lem Winchester and the Ramsey Lewis Trio (subtitled Perform a Tribute to Clifford Brown) is the debut album by American jazz vibraphonist Lem Winchester and the third album by Ramsey Lewis' Trio featuring tracks associated with trumpeter Clifford Brown recorded in 1958 and released on the Argo label.

Reception

Allmusic awarded the album 4 stars stating: "A good example of Ramsey Lewis' original piano style, the little-known set is actually excellent and would be easily recommended to straight-ahead jazz fans if it could be found".

Track listing
All compositions by Clifford Brown, except as indicated
 "Joy Spring" - 3:25  
 "Where It Is" (Lem Winchester) - 4:27
 "Sandu" - 6:12   
 "Once in a While" (Michael Edwards, Bud Green) - 5:28  
 "Jordu" (Duke Jordan) - 3:23   
 "It Could Happen to You" (Jimmy Van Heusen, Johnny Burke) - 3:39 
 "Easy to Love" (Cole Porter) - 3:34 
 "A Message from Boysie" (Robert Lowery) - 5:08

Personnel 
Lem Winchester - vibraphone
Ramsey Lewis - piano
El Dee Young - bass
Issac "Red" Holt - drums
Technical
Malcolm Chisholm - recording engineer
W. Hopkins - cover design

References 

 

1958 albums
Ramsey Lewis albums
Argo Records albums
Lem Winchester albums
Clifford Brown tribute albums